Joshua Selig (born May 12, 1964) is an American television producer and director. He won ten Daytime Emmy Awards for his work as a writer on Sesame Street. After leaving Sesame Street, Selig partnered with Lori Shaer to create a studio called Little Airplane Productions. Through Little Airplane, Selig produced Oobi for Noggin, Wonder Pets! for Nickelodeon, and 3rd & Bird for the BBC.

Josh Selig left Little Airplane in 2020.

Early life
Josh Selig was born on the Upper West Side of Manhattan. He began his career as a child actor on Sesame Street during its first two seasons. As a teenager, Selig attended Sarah Lawrence College, where he studied theater and poetry. He returned to Sesame Street in 1988 as a writer. He also worked on the Israeli-Palestinian and Polish adaptations of the show during the 1990s.

Career 
In 1998, he conceived the idea for Little Airplane Productions. The company was initially a joint effort between Selig and Lori Shaer (née Sherman). Until 2006, the studio's works were solely live-action. Oobi was the first original series produced by the company; it began as a series of interstitials in 2000 and later ran for two seasons of half-hour episodes. The series was heavily inspired by Selig's time as a Sesame Street writer; he based its puppet characters on a training method used by Muppet performers learning to lip-sync, in which they use their bare hands and a pair of ping pong balls instead of a puppet. In 2003, Selig wrote and directed a short film titled The Time-Out Chair. Written and directed by Selig, the film premiered at the 2003 Tribeca Film Festival and was later acquired by the Museum of Modern Art. Profits from Oobi allowed Selig to create an animation division at Little Airplane, leading it to shift to an animation-based studio.<ref>{{Cite magazine|url=https://ew.com/article/2007/04/22/kids-corner-qa-wonder-petss-josh-selig/|title = Kids' Corner Q&A: The Wonder Pets'''s Josh Selig| magazine=Entertainment Weekly }}</ref>

Selig created Go, Baby! in 2004 as a series for Playhouse Disney. In 2005, he directed two pilots for the Wonder Pets! series along with Jennifer Oxley. The show premiered in the United States on March 3, 2006. Selig opened two new branches of Little Airplane in London and Abu Dhabi in 2007. Josh Selig's first international co-production, 3rd & Bird, debuted on CBeebies in June 2008. He continued to produce short-form series throughout the 2010s. Small Potatoes, commissioned by Disney Junior, spawned a television movie that Selig directed in 2013. In the same year, he pitched a pilot titled The Jo B. & G. Raff Show! to Amazon Studios, which was not picked up. He is currently the creator and executive producer of Disney's P. King Duckling and of the South Korean series Super Wings''.

Filmography

Awards and nominations

References

1964 births
Living people
Television producers from New York City
American television directors
American male screenwriters
Sarah Lawrence College alumni
People from the Upper West Side
Writers from Manhattan
Daytime Emmy Award winners
Screenwriters from New York (state)